Soane is the name of:

Surname
 Bryan Soane (born 1988), Australian footballer
 George Soane (1790–1860), English writer and dramatist
 Henry Soane (1622–1661), Virginia politician and landowner
 John Soane (1753–1837), English architect and collector
 Stuart Soane (born 1987), Scottish footballer
 Soane (1790s cricketer) (born c. 1770), an English cricketer active in the 1790s

Given name
 Soane Asi (born 1963), Tongan former rugby union player
 Soane Havea (born 1981), Tongan rugby union player
 Soane Lilo Foliaki (1933–2013), Roman Catholic bishop of Tonga
 Soane-Patita Lavuia, king of Wallis Island from 1910 until 1916
 Soane Patita Maituku (born 1947), Tu'i Agaifo of Alo, Tonga
 Soane Patita Paini Mafi (born 1961), Roman Catholic Bishop of Tonga
 Soane Toke, king of Wallis Island for one day in 1953
 Soane Tongaʻuiha (born 1982), Tongan rugby union player

See also
 Sir John Soane's Museum, London
 Zeb Soanes (born 1976)
 Soane Monument